WCYJ-FM (99.5 FM) is a student-run radio station broadcasting a hot adult contemporary format. Licensed to Waynesburg, Pennsylvania, US, it serves the Waynesburg area.  The station is currently owned by Waynesburg University. Streaming live at www.waynesburgsports.com

Popular programs include shows like "The Love Lounge," which was started by alumnus Antonio Pelullo. Other shows, such as "Two Dudes on the Radio" are big hits for the station. WCYJ-FM is led by student general manager Christopher Hulse.

WCYJ-FM also broadcast Waynesburg sporting events, such as football, basketball and baseball.

External links

CYJ-FM
Radio stations established in 1977